Zorocratidae is a formerly accepted family of spiders. Most of the genera formerly placed in this family have been transferred to the family Udubidae. The type genus, Zorocrates, is now placed in the Zoropsidae.

 Campostichomma Karsch, 1891 → Udubidae
 Raecius Simon, 1892 → Udubidae
 Uduba Simon, 1880 → Udubidae
 Zorocrates Simon, 1888 → Zoropsidae
 Zorodictyna Strand, 1907 → Udubidae

References

 

Historically recognized spider taxa